Patrick Bjorkstrand (born 1 July 1992) is a Danish professional ice hockey forward currently playing for Aalborg Pirates of the Metal Ligaen (DEN). He formerly played with the Ontario Reign of the AHL while under contract to the Los Angeles Kings of the National Hockey League (NHL).

He is the son of hockey coach Todd Bjorkstrand and the older brother of Oliver Bjorkstrand.

Playing career
Bjorkstrand made his first steps at the senior level in his native Denmark with Herning Blue Fox of the Metal Ligaen. He won the Danish national championship with Herning in 2011 and 2012. He spent the 2012–13 campaign with Mora IK of the Swedish HockeyAllsvenskan. From 2013 to 2016, Bjorkstrand played for Medveščak Zagreb of the Kontinental Hockey League (KHL), interrupted by a Finland stint with SaiPa in the course of the 2014–15 season.

On 14 July 2016 he signed a one-year, entry-level contract with the Los Angeles Kings of the National Hockey League (NHL) and spent the season with the Kings' American Hockey League (AHL) affiliate Ontario Reign. After the season Bjorkstrand returned to Finland and signed with KooKoo of Liiga on 3 August 2017. He left Finland in February 2018 to head to Germany, where he signed with the Nürnberg Ice Tigers of the DEL.

In the off-season, Bjorkstrand returned for a third stint in the Finnish Liiga, agreeing as a free agent to a one-year contract with HC TPS on 5 June 2018. He contributed with his two-way play, recording 10 goals and 20 points in 59 games in the 2018–19 season.

On 5 June 2019 Bjorkstrand left the Liiga as a free agent, signing an initial one-year contract with Austrian club, EC Panaceo VSV, of the EBEL.

International play
Bjorkstrand competed in the 2013, 2014, 2015, and 2016 IIHF World Championship as a member of the Denmark men's national ice hockey team.

Career statistics

Regular season and playoffs

International

References

External links
 

1992 births
Living people
AaB Ishockey players
Danish ice hockey forwards
Danish people of American descent
Herning Blue Fox players
KHL Medveščak Zagreb players
KooKoo players
Mora IK players
Ontario Reign (AHL) players
People from Herning Municipality
SaiPa players
Thomas Sabo Ice Tigers players
HC TPS players
Sportspeople from the Central Denmark Region
EC VSV players